Afrosciadium abyssinicum, synonym Peucedanum abyssinicum, is a member of the carrot family, Apiaceae.  It is native to Ethiopia, where it grows at high elevations.

References

Flora of East Tropical Africa
Flora of Ethiopia
Apioideae